John Gamble Burton (born May 25, 1947 in Evanston, Illinois) is an American retired slalom canoeist who competed from the late 1960s to the early 1970s. He finished 12th in the C-2 event at the 1972 Summer Olympics in Munich.

References
Sports-reference.com profile

1947 births
American male canoeists
Canoeists at the 1972 Summer Olympics
Living people
Olympic canoeists of the United States